In View is a Canadian cultural current affairs television series which aired on CBC Television from 1962 to 1963.

Premise
Nathan Cohen hosted this series on culture, especially in media. The debut episode concerned television and particularly Sir Harry Pilkington's report on broadcasting in the United Kingdom. Publishing industry topics were also covered, such as a strike at The New York Times and a feature on paperback publishing with Fred Kerner of book publisher Fawcett.

Scheduling
This half-hour series was broadcast on Mondays at 10:30 p.m. (Eastern) from 15 October 1962 to 6 May 1963, on weeks when Festival ran 60 instead of 90 minutes.

References

External links
 

CBC Television original programming
1962 Canadian television series debuts
1963 Canadian television series endings